Eileen Goldsen (born May 16, 1941) is an American-born former pop singer, songwriter and music publisher, who has mainly worked and lived in France since the 1960s.  Her recordings credit her mononymously as Eileen.

Biography
She was born in New York City, the daughter of Mickey Goldsen (1912–2011), a music publisher who founded the Criterion Music Corporation.  Eileen Goldsen studied languages, including French, at the University of California, Los Angeles, graduating in 1963.  The following year, she settled in Paris, France, initially working as a teacher, and was asked to translate American folk songs into French.  Lucien Morisse, director of the radio station Europe 1, suggested she make recordings of her own songs, and she found some success with her songs "Prends ta guitare" and "Une grenouille dans le vent", issued on the AZ label and credited simply to Eileen.  In 1965, she married producer and songwriter Jacques Robinson.

In early 1966, she recorded versions of "These Boots Are Made for Walkin'" – a song published by her father's company – in English, French ("Ces bottes sont faites pour marcher"), German ("Die Stiefel sind zum Wandern") and Italian ("Questi stivali sono fatti per camminare").   Her session musicians included American guitarist Mickey Baker.  Although the recordings were promoted on TV programmes and had some success, they lost out commercially to Nancy Sinatra's original recording.  In April 1966 she was included in Jean-Marie Périer's photograph of 46 yé-yé and other French pop singers known as "La Photo du siècle".  She also recorded an English version of Sinatra's follow-up record, "How Does That Grab You, Darlin'?", and a version of "Love Is Strange", originally recorded in 1956 by Baker with Sylvia Robinson as Mickey and Sylvia.  She continued to record in France until 1969, when she gave up recording until a brief comeback in 1982.

She founded a music publishing company, French Fried Music, in Paris.

List of Songs 
This is a list of her songs sung in the various languages. 
Given is also the composer and the texter.
Source is

References

External links
 

1941 births
Living people
Yé-yé singers
American expatriates in France
German-language singers
Italian-language singers
French women pop singers